White River is a township located in Northern Ontario, Canada, along Highway 17 of the Trans-Canada Highway. It was originally a rail town on the Canadian Pacific Railway in 1885.

Its main employers are Albert Bazzoni Ltd., A&W Restaurant, Tri Timber, NCCP, CP Rail, Home Hardware, and Primary Power.

History
In the early 1880s, White River started as a workcamp along the Canadian Pacific Railway, then under construction, but grew into a town when this site was selected by William Van Horne as the railway's divisional point. By 1886, it had a station house, fine hotels and an ice house. A stockyard to feed and water the livestock that regularly traveled through was also added. Its population grew from 10 families in 1886 to 42 families in 1906.

In 1961, Highway 17 reached White River, making it accessible by car. This brought new industries and businesses, particularly tourism-related, to the town, ending its existence as an exclusive railway town. In the 1970s, Abitibi-Price established a lumber mill, which was purchased by Domtar Forest Products in 1984 and closed in July 2007. In 2013, the Domtar assets were purchased by the Township of White River and the Netmizaaggamig Nishnaabeg (Pic Mobert First Nation) along with private partners. The mill was then reopened, with significant investment in new equipment, as White River Forest Products LP.

Geography
White River is located north of Lake Superior, on the namesake White River and halfway along Highway 17 between Marathon and Wawa. This is also roughly halfway between Toronto and Winnipeg.

Climate

Even in Ontario, the coldest recorded temperature was in Iroquois Falls on 23 January 1935 [], which is also the lowest temperature ever recorded in Eastern Canada. White River's reputation for being the "coldest spot" is probably based on the fact that for many years, its reported temperature was deemed "the coldest in the nation today" from the handful of stations reporting daily temperature extremes in newspapers and on radio, with most stations' data being available only on a monthly basis to Environment Canada at the time.

Its official weather station (which closed in 1976) was located in a frost hollow, but most residential areas have good air drainage and do not see temperatures far below . Gardeners can keep their flowers alive into October and grow non-boreal species such as silver maple.

Demographics 

Mother tongue:
 English as first language: 78%
 French as first language: 16%
 English and French as first language: 1%
 Other as first language: 5%

Tourism

The township is perhaps best known for being the home of Winnie the Pooh. In August 1914, a trapped black bear cub was sold to Captain Harry Colebourn in White River, and Colebourn named it Winnipeg, or Winnie, after his hometown of Winnipeg, Manitoba. Over the years, the animal became the basis for the popular literary character. The town celebrates "Winnie's Hometown Festival" every third week in August.

Being surrounded by wilderness, White River has a lot of outdoor recreation opportunities. Summer activities include hiking, biking, fishing, hunting, boating and canoeing. In the winter the town offers cross-country skiing and snowmobiling.

Other attractions include:
 Heritage Museum - documents the history of White River and includes Canadian Pacific Railway artifacts, rare Winnie the Pooh artifacts, displays White River in the early 1900s, as well as some artwork by the Group of Seven.
 Authentic Canadian Pacific Railway caboose
 Picnic Lake - with an unsupervised sandy beach, picnic tables, and boat launch.
 Tukanee Lake - nature area with rocks, water, and trails.

Transportation

White River is located at the intersection of Highway 17 and Highway 631, which connects the town to Highway 11 to the north.

White River station is the western terminus of Via Rail's thrice-weekly Sudbury–White River train, which operates east to Greater Sudbury. Greyhound Canada stopped serving White River on 31 October 2018, when it ended all service west of Sudbury. Ontario Northland buses continue to serve White River.

In popular culture
White River is referenced by the Canadian singer/songwriter Christine Fellows in her song "Migrations". It's also the title of a great Canadian breakup song by Tyler Ellis, entitled "White River" no less.

See also
List of townships in Ontario
List of francophone communities in Ontario

References

External links

Hudson's Bay Company trading posts
Municipalities in Algoma District
Single-tier municipalities in Ontario
Township municipalities in Ontario
Railway towns in Ontario